John Butler (born 25 January 1969) is a Scottish former professional footballer who played as a midfielder.

Career
Born in Bellshill, Butler played for Orbiston, St Mirren, Stirling Albion, Airdrieonians and Stranraer before retiring due to injury. In 1992, prior to his injury, he had signed a "dream" two-year contract with Australian side Sydney Croatia, but suffered an ankle injury whilst playing on loan at Stranraer. Butler spent 18 months with his ankle in plaster, and later worked in a pub for a few years before becoming unemployed and on state benefits in 1997.

He was a Scotland youth international, and participated at the 1987 FIFA World Youth Championship.

References

1969 births
Living people
Scottish footballers
St Mirren F.C. players
Stirling Albion F.C. players
Airdrieonians F.C. (1878) players
Stranraer F.C. players
Scottish Football League players
Association football midfielders
Scotland youth international footballers